Aman Arora is an Indian politician. He is currently a Member of the Legislative Assembly for Sunam Assembly constituency, and is the co-president of the Punjab state unit of Aam Aadmi Party.

Political career
Arora was elected from Sunam constituency for the first time as an MLA in the March 2017 Punjab Legislative Assembly election by a record 30,307 votes. He was re-elected as an MLA from Sunam and defeated his nearest opponent Jaswinder Singh Dhiman of Congress with a margin of 75,277 votes. He is the co-president of the Punjab state unit of AAP. The son of Bhagwan Das Arora, two-time MLA and Minister of Punjab, he joined politics at an early age and contested elections from Sunam twice, in 2007 and 2012 on the ticket of Indian National Congress. In January 2016, after being influenced by Arvind Kejriwal’s politics of the common man, he joined the Aam Aadmi Party.

He became the co-convener of Aam Aadmi Party on 10 May 2017. He resigned from this post after apology by Arvind Kejriwal from Bikram Singh Majithia. In 2019 before 2019 Indian general election in Punjab he was appointed the chief of election campaign committee.

The Aam Aadmi Party gained a strong 79% majority in the sixteenth Punjab Legislative Assembly by winning 92 out of 117 seats in the 2022 Punjab Legislative Assembly election. MP Bhagwant Mann was sworn in as Chief Minister on 16 March 2022.

Member of Legislative Assembly
He represents the Sunam Assembly constituency as MLA in Punjab Assembly.

Committee assignments of Punjab Legislative Assembly
Chairman (2022–23) Committee on Public Accounts

Cabinet Minister
5 MLAs including Aman Arora were inducted into the cabinet and their swearing in ceremony took place on 4 July 2022. On 5 July, Bhagwant Mann announced the expansion of his cabinet of ministers with five new ministers to the departments of Punjab state government. Aman Arora was among the inducted ministers and was given the charge of following departments.

Electoral performance

References 

  

 

Living people
Punjab, India MLAs 2017–2022
Aam Aadmi Party politicians from Punjab, India
Indian National Congress politicians from Punjab, India
1974 births
People from Sangrur district
Punjab, India MLAs 2022–2027